Gunnar A. Sjögren ("GAS"; 1920–1996) was a Swedish engineer who worked for Saab Automobile and the author of The SAAB Way - the first 35 years of Saab cars, 1949–1984.

Biography 

Born in Stockholm in 1920, he spent his youth in the northern Swedish city of Umeå. During this period he developed a passion for drawing cars, trains aeroplanes and boats. It was soon to become focused on cars, and remained such throughout his life. 

After leaving high school, he spent a year in an engineering workshop manufacturing trolleybuses, whereafter he went to engineering college in Örebro in order to realise his dream of fully understanding cars and entering into the auto industry. The most notable event during his education was an essay written at high school entitled "About cars and car makes" that would have gained the maximum mark had it not been for his error of spelling "Orient" with a small "o".

On December 1, 1941, he was taken on at General Motors in Stockholm as a draughtsman, after having submitted his drawings along with an employment application. He was later transferred to the advertising department where he produced illustrations for the variety of GM products marketed in Sweden.

In his spare time, he started submitting drawings to auto magazines and soon became a regular contributor to "Motor" in Sweden. He also was appointed editor of "GM-Revyn", the company's customer magazine, thanks to his talent for both writing and illustrating. It was at this time, the fall of 1946 that he bought his first car, a Chevrolet Fleetmaster Sport Sedan (model 2103), model year 1946. Color: grey.

After 13 years he left GM and became a freelancer with commissions from advertising agencies and magazines. After five years of the irregular hours of a self-employed person, he decided to return to industry. He had his eyes set on one particular firm: Saab. As luck would have it Saab advertised for an illustrator and Gunnar Sjögren moved down to Saab's headquarters in Linköping in the fall of 1959.

Association with Saab
He remained loyal to Saab ever since, moving to wherever the passenger car business had its headquarters: first to Södertälje and finally to its present location in Nyköping, just 60 miles south of Stockholm.

At Saab, Sjögren became deeply involved both in the shaping of the advertising material used to sell the cars as well as in the design and color scheme advisory groups.

Over the years Sjögren assembled a wealth of material about the Saab car, its design philosophy and the marketing strategies followed in bringing the cars to the eyes of the car buying public. In doing so he became owner of a vast fund of knowledge of the cars for which he became a key figure behind the scenes.

His knowledge about cars was legendary and, without hesitation he could correctly sketch with unfailing accuracy most of the important cars of the last 40 or 50 years - particularly if they happened to be made by Saab or General Motors.

Other interests
But despite this abiding and seemingly all-consuming interest in cars, Gunnar Sjögren developed a profound and expert interest in many other fields. He was a nature lover who made it a habit to learn the Latin names of plants and flora and fauna that came his way - all of which he could depict in characteristic line drawings with great accuracy. He painted nature scenes and even dared to do so in oils. Since 1975 he was also a true philatelist who mounted his collection artistically and with informative explanations on sheets of his own design. Other indoor interests that served as a background to his major pursuit were classical music, with a strong penchant towards the Vienna school, smoking a pipe or a cigar and enjoying a glass of good wine or Scotch whisky. His dislikes included sports, entertainment programmes on TV and popular music. At 60, Sjögren decided to retire from Saab, but still devoted some of his time to Saab matters - such as writing the book "The Saab Way" - so even though he now could devote all the time he wanted to his other hobbies, he still seemed to have gasoline in his blood.

References 
Source: "The Saab Way", pages 100, 101.

External links
 The Saab Way online

1920 births
1996 deaths
Swedish automobile designers
Saab